Wilhelm Wolf may refer to:

Wilhelm Wolff, 19th-century socialist
Wilhelm Wulff, 20th-century occultist associated with The Occult Roots of Nazism
Wilhelm Wolf, one of the Nazis who died in Hitler's Beer Hall Putsch
Wilhelm Wolf (1897-1939), Nazi politician and last Austrian foreign minister before the Anschluss
Ernst Wilhelm Wolf (1735-1792), German composer
Friedrich Wilhelm Wolff, German sculptor